Orodruin is an alternative name for Mount Doom, a fictional location in J. R. R. Tolkien's The Lord of the Rings.

Orodruin may also refer to:
Orodruin (band), a doom metal band.